Dance Ranch is a studio album by country music artist Hank Thompson and His Brazos Valley Boys. It was released in 1958 by Capitol Records (catalog no. T-875).

In the annual poll of country music disc jockeys by Billboard magazine, Dance Ranch ranked as the No. 10 album of 1958.

AllMusic gave the album a rating of five stars. Reviewer Bruce Eder called it "one of the group's best albums."

Track listing
Side A
 "Beaumont Rag"
 "Headin' Down the Wrong Highway"
 "After All the Things I've Done"
 "Woodchopper's Ball"
 "Drivin' Nails in My Coffin"
 "Klishama Klingo"

Side B
 "Bartenders' Polka"
 "Bubbles in My Beer"
 "Make Room in Your Heart (For a Memory)"
 "Summit Ridge Drive"
 "I Wouldn't Miss It for the World"
 "Lawdy, What a Gal"

References

1958 albums
Hank Thompson (musician) albums
Capitol Records albums